Bernt Scheler (born 25 October 1955) is a Swedish former cyclist. He competed in the individual road race event at the 1980 Summer Olympics.

References

External links
 

1955 births
Living people
Swedish male cyclists
Olympic cyclists of Sweden
Cyclists at the 1980 Summer Olympics
Sportspeople from Jönköping County